The 1987 NCAA Men's Water Polo Championship was the 19th annual NCAA Men's Water Polo Championship to determine the national champion of NCAA men's collegiate water polo. Tournament matches were played at the Belmont Plaza Pool in Long Beach, California during December 1987.

California defeated USC in the final, 9–8 (in one overtime), to win their seventh national title. Coached by Pete Cutino, the Golden Bears finished the season 27–3.

The Most Outstanding Player of the tournament was Giacomo Rossi (USC). An All-Tournament Team of eight players was also named. 

The tournament's leading scorers, with 12 goals each, were Rafael Gandarillas (Pepperdine) and Alexis Rousseau (UCLA)

Qualification
Since there has only ever been one single national championship for water polo, all NCAA men's water polo programs (whether from Division I, Division II, or Division III) were eligible. A total of 8 teams were invited to contest this championship.

Bracket
Site: Belmont Plaza Pool, Long Beach, California

All-tournament team 
Giacomo Rossi, USC (Most outstanding player)
Jeff Brush, California
Fernando Carsalade, UCLA
Kirk Everist, California
Erich Fischer, Stanford
Keith Leggett, USC
Sasa Poljak, Pepperdine
Alexis Rousseau, UCLA

See also 
 NCAA Men's Water Polo Championship

References

NCAA Men's Water Polo Championship
NCAA Men's Water Polo Championship
1987 in sports in California
December 1987 sports events in the United States
1987